AEW Fight for the Fallen is a professional wrestling event produced by All Elite Wrestling (AEW). Established in 2019, it is held annually in July as a charity event to raise money for different causes, which is a reference to the event's title. These events have helped raise money to support victims of gun violence, people affected by the COVID-19 pandemic, and various other non-profit organizations. Since 2020, Fight for the Fallen has been held as a television special of AEW's weekly television programs.

The inaugural event was streamed for free on B/R Live in North America and aired on pay-per-view (PPV) internationally. The second iteration of the event aired as a special episode of Wednesday Night Dynamite, which started its annual broadcasting format as a television special. In 2022, the event was expanded to a two-part television special, also encompassing Friday Night Rampage.

History
The inaugural Fight for the Fallen took place on July 13, 2019 at Daily's Place in Jacksonville, Florida and was All Elite Wrestling's (AEW) third-ever event held. The company held the charity event to support victims of gun violence, with all gate receipts from the event being donated to these victims. The event was titled as a reference to this cause. In North America, the event was streamed for free on B/R Live, while internationally, it aired on pay-per-view (PPV). 

The following year, AEW held a second Fight for the Fallen event, this time as a special episode of their flagship television program, Dynamite, which aired on July 15, 2020. It was also broadcast from Daily's Place, but this time, it was due to the COVID-19 pandemic that began in March that year, which forced the majority of AEW's programs to be held at Daily's Place. This second iteration in turn raised money for COVID-19 relief. 

The 2021 event was announced to also broadcast as a special episode of Dynamite, thus becoming the annual broadcasting format for Fight for the Fallen. It was also the first Fight for the Fallen to be held outside of Daily's Place. Following AEW's return to live touring during the COVID-19 pandemic, the 2021 event was held on July 28 at the Bojangles Coliseum in Charlotte, North Carolina and was the final event in AEW's "Welcome Back" tour. The 2021 event's charitable cause raised money to support victims of domestic violence and sexual assault survivors.

In August 2021, AEW launched a secondary television program titled Rampage, airing on Friday nights. In turn, the 2022 Fight for the Fallen was expanded to a two-part event, encompassing the broadcasts of Dynamite and Rampage. Dynamite aired live on July 27 while Rampage was taped the same night but aired on tape delay on July 29.

Events

References

External links

 
Recurring events established in 2019